Communauté d'agglomération Nîmes Métropole is the communauté d'agglomération, an intercommunal structure, centred on the city of Nîmes. It is located in the Gard department, in the Occitanie region, southern France. It was created in January 2002. Its area is 790.9 km2. Its population was 257,987 in 2014, of which 149,633 in Nîmes proper.

Composition
The communauté d'agglomération consists of the following 39 communes:

Bernis
Bezouce
Bouillargues
Cabrières
Caissargues
La Calmette
Caveirac
Clarensac
Dions
Domessargues
Fons
Gajan
Garons
Générac
Langlade
Lédenon
Manduel
Marguerittes
Mauressargues
Milhaud
Montagnac
Montignargues
Moulézan
Nîmes
Poulx
Redessan
Rodilhan
La Rouvière
Saint-Bauzély
Saint-Chaptes
Saint-Côme-et-Maruéjols
Saint-Dionisy
Sainte-Anastasie
Saint-Geniès-de-Malgoirès
Saint-Gervasy
Saint-Gilles
Saint-Mamert-du-Gard
Sauzet
Sernhac

References

Nîmes
Nimes
Nimes